George Jeffreys (28 February 1889– 26 January 1962) was a Welsh evangelist who founded the Elim Pentecostal Church, a Pentecostal organisation.

Biography
As a fifteen-year-old from Nantyffylon, Maesteg, Wales, George became a Christian during the 1904-1905 Welsh Revival, along with his older brother Stephen. At the time, many local Christians believed the two brothers were appointed by God to do great works for Him.

Ministry
In 1910, after becoming a very popular speaker in certain circles throughout the country, George went to the All Saints' Anglican Church in Sunderland, England. There he saw people expressing the Gifts of the Spirit, particularly speaking in tongues as in Acts chapter 2 in the Bible. George was at first opposed to this, but when his nephew, Edward, claimed to have received the Baptism of the Holy Spirit, and he noticed the change in his nephew, he repented of his unbelief in the All Saints' church, and subsequently, began to express such gifts himself.

In the many churches, conventions and camp meetings where George and Stephen Jeffreys preached in the years after this, there were reports of many miraculous healings and other acts of God. Such healings brought George to his "foursquare" belief that Jesus is Saviour, Healer, Baptiser and Coming King. George, along with a small group of peers, became known as the Elim Evangelistic Band in Belfast and all over Ulster. This group of people brought crowds into their large tent, and later, into the Belfast hall they acquired. Out of this, George founded his first church in Belfast in 1914 followed by one in Monaghan in 1915, and the Elim Foursquare Gospel Alliance, as it is officially known, was born.

Many more Elim churches were soon planted all over the United Kingdom, first of all spreading through the province of Ulster to Ballymena, Moneyslane and Portadown, then on to Leigh-on-Sea, Essex, The First Elim Church in England, and Clapham in London and in Wales at Llanelli and Dowlais. In 1925, he founded the Elim Bible College in Clapham, which moved to Nantwich, Cheshire, in 1987 and later became Regents Theological College. The college moved again in 2009 to West Malvern.

George continued to lead the Elim Pentecostal Churches until 1939 when, due to differences in opinion on church leadership and the idea of British Israelism, he left Elim and went to Nottingham to found the Bible-Pattern Church Fellowship. The new denomination suffered a serious decline in numbers in the later years of the 1960s and no longer exists as a separate entity, its main church, Kensington Temple, having become the central London church of the Elim Pentecostal Church.

In 1962 George spoke with Reinhard Bonnke the evangelist concerning the ministry that Bonnke was about to begin in South Africa. Bonnke stumbled onto Jeffreys' home in Clapham while on vacation in London. The old evangelist invited Bonnke in for tea. Jeffreys prayed for the young 21-year-old Bonnke, passing on his "mantle".

Jeffrey's affirmed the "perfect inspiration and complete authority of the Bible, as given originally by God to men." He rejected the higher criticism.

References

1889 births
1962 deaths
Elim Pentecostal Church
Welsh Pentecostals
People from Maesteg
British Israelism